Zeynalan-e Sofla (also Romanized as Zeynalān-e Soflá; also known as Zeynlān) is a village in Osmanvand Rural District, Firuzabad District, Kermanshah County, Kermanshah Province, Iran. At the 2006 census, its population was 80, in 14 families.

References 

Populated places in Kermanshah County